The Prince with the Red Mask (Italian: Il principe dalla maschera rossa) is a 1955 Italian historical adventure film directed by Leopoldo Savona and starring Frank Latimore, Maria Fiore and Yvonne Furneaux.

The film's sets were designed by the art director Ottavio Scotti.

Cast
 Frank Latimore as Masuccio, il principe dalla maschera rossa 
 Maria Fiore as Isabella 
 Yvonne Furneaux as Laura 
 Elio Steiner as Il capitano Alberino 
 Camillo Pilotto as Ser Gaspare 
 Livio Lorenzon as Monaldo 
 Maria Gambarelli as Giselda 
 Mario Sailer
 Vincent Barbi
 Sante Simeone
 Tony Angeli
 Loris Bazzocchi
 Luciano Benetti
 Sergio Fantoni

References

Bibliography 
 Curti, Roberto. Riccardo Freda: The Life and Works of a Born Filmmaker. McFarland, 13 Mar 2017.

External links 
 

1955 films
Italian historical adventure films
1950s historical adventure films
1950s Italian-language films
Films directed by Leopoldo Savona
Italian black-and-white films
1950s Italian films